Aphanopsidaceae is a family of lichenized fungi in the order Lecanorales. It contains the genera Aphanopsis and Steinia, comprising five species. The family was circumscribed in 1995 by lichenologists Christian Printzen and Gerhard Rambold.

References

Lecanorales
Lichen families
Taxa described in 1995